Linked with the international group Catholic Voices,  Catholic Comment is a national socially conservative advocacy group based in Ireland. Its membership is limited to people who are "enthusiastic about their faith". Its self-described aim is to "try to throw light on the mission and message of the Catholic Church" and "complement the work carried out by bishops and others". Launched for Dublin's International Eucharistic Congress in June 2012, it immediately began work at promoting Catholic doctrine in media interviews, appearing on dozens of programmes in its first year. It is at the fore of arguing for the preservation of a Catholic ethos in schools and opposes any move towards same-sex marriage. It receives many requests from the Dublin media in particular. Petra Conroy, who co-ordinates the group, is on record as saying, “We would never refuse any show as long as we have someone available”.

References

2012 establishments in Ireland
Conservatism in Ireland
Political advocacy groups in the Republic of Ireland